Rob Powers (born 1965) is an American television news anchor and journalist based at WEWS-TV 5, the Scripps-owned ABC affiliate in Cleveland, Ohio.

Powers was named co-anchor of WEWS's evening newscasts in August 2016. Prior to joining WEWS, Powers was a sportscaster for several major-market television stations, including ABC flagship WABC-TV.

Career 
Powers was born in Cleveland, Ohio. Powers' early television assignments included stops in Binghamton, New York, and Indianapolis. He was later named sports director and 5:30 p.m. news anchor for WTVG, an ABC affiliate in Toledo, Ohio (at the time also directly owned by the network). 

When not anchoring sports, he was the play-by-play voice announcer for University of Toledo football and basketball, as well as the city's minor league baseball team, the Toledo Mud Hens. After his stay at WTVG, he became the weekday evening and Saturday morning sports anchor for WABC-TV, ABC's flagship station in New York City.  On July 28, 2016, Powers announced via Facebook that he would leave WABC-TV on July 29 to his hometown, Cleveland, for a news anchor job at ABC affiliate WEWS-TV and to also reunite with his family in Cleveland.

On December 22, 2018, Powers became the host of WEWS' high school quiz Academic Challenge.

Awards
While in Toledo, Powers earned four Emmy Awards., and has gone on to win more Lower Great Lakes Emmy Awards in various categories since coming to WEWS.

References

External links 
 

1965 births
Living people
American television sports anchors
College basketball announcers in the United States
Emmy Award winners
Journalists from Indiana
American male journalists
Journalists from Ohio
Journalists from Upstate New York
Sportspeople from Binghamton, New York
People from Indianapolis
Sportspeople from Manhattan
Sportspeople from Toledo, Ohio
Television anchors from New York City
Toledo Mud Hens
Minor League Baseball broadcasters
College football announcers
Toledo Rockets football announcers
University of Toledo people
20th-century births
20th-century American people
21st-century American people
Place of birth missing (living people)